José Nat (12 September 1887 – 15 June 1962) was a French racing cyclist. He rode in the 1920 Tour de France.

References

1887 births
1962 deaths
French male cyclists